A chef is a person who cooks professionally.

Chef or The Chef may also refer to:

People
 Chef (nickname) list of people with the nickname or pseudonym "Chef"

Arts, entertainment, and media

Films
Chef (2014 film), a 2014 film directed by Jon Favreau
 Chef (2017 film), an Indian film directed by Raja Krishna Menon
 The Chef (film), a 2012 French comedy film directed by Daniel Cohen

Television
 Chef!, a 1993-1996 BBC sitcom
 Chefs (TV series), a 2015 French television series
 The Chef (TV series), a 2009 Iranian TV series

Characters
 Chef (South Park), a character in South Park
 Swedish Chef, a character from The Muppet Show

Other arts, entertainment, and media
 CHEF, a defunct radio station in Granby, Quebec, Canada
 Chef (magazine), a Swedish business magazine
 The Chefs, a Brighton-based pop group
 Chef (Game & Watch), a 1981 video game made by Nintendo for the Game & Watch
 The Chef (novel), a novel by James Patterson and Max DiLallo (2019)

Brands and enterprises
 Chef (baking), a bread starter
 Chef, a cat food brand manufactured by Wattie's
 "Chef" brand, an Irish condiment brand owned by Valeo Foods

Computing
Chef (company), the makers of Chef software
 Chef (software), an open source configuration management tool
 Chef (programming language), an esoteric programming language designed by David Morgan-Mar

See also
Chief (disambiguation)